Maconacon, officially the Municipality of Maconacon (Tagalog/Kasiguranin: Bayan ng Maconacon), is a 3rd class municipality in the province of Isabela, Philippines. According to the 2020 census, it has a population of 3,977 people, making it the least populous municipality in the province.

Geography
Maconacon is one of the four coastal municipalities of the province of Isabela facing the Philippine Sea to the east. Separated from the rest of the province by the mighty Sierra Madre mountains, it is considered to be one of the most remote and isolated community in the province.

The town is bounded to the north by Peñablanca in the province of Cagayan, San Pablo and Cabagan to the west, Tumauini to the southwest, Divilacan to the south and the Philippine Sea to the east.

Barangays
Maconacon is politically subdivided into 10 barangays. These barangays are headed by elected officials: Barangay Captain, Barangay Council, whose members are called Barangay Councilors. All are elected every three years.
 Diana
 Eleonor (Poblacion)
 Fely (Poblacion)
 Lita (Poblacion)
 Reina Mercedes
 Minanga
 Malasin
 Canadam
 Aplaya
 Santa Marina (Dianggo)

Climate

Maconacon has a tropical monsoon climate (Am) with moderate rainfall from January to May and heavy to very heavy rainfall from June to December.

Demographics

Economy

Government

Local government
The municipality is governed by a mayor designated as its local chief executive and by a municipal council as its legislative body in accordance with the Local Government Code. The mayor, vice mayor, and the councilors are elected directly by the people through an election which is being held every three years.

Elected officials

Congress representation
Maconacon, belonging to the first legislative district of the province of Isabela, currently represented by Hon. Antonio T. Albano.

Education
The Schools Division of Isabela governs the town's public education system. The division office is a field office of the DepEd in Cagayan Valley region. The office governs the public and private elementary and public and private high schools throughout the municipality.

Infrastructure
Maconacon is accessible via sea and air. Its primary gateway is the Maconacon Airport which connects this isolated town to the rest of the province through Cauayan Airport, also in Cauayan.

References

External links

Municipal Profile at the National Competitiveness Council of the Philippines
Maconacon at the Isabela Government Website
Local Governance Performance Management System
[ Philippine Standard Geographic Code]
Philippine Census Information
Municipality of Maconacon

Municipalities of Isabela (province)